CyberRogues is a supplement published by Iron Crown Enterprises (I.C.E.) in 1990 for the cyberpunk near-future science fiction role-playing game Cyberspace.

Contents
CyberRogues is a supplement which details 30 non-player characters that the gamemaster can add to a Cyberspace campaign. The description of each character includes a complete personal background, attitude, appearance, skills, languages, and game statistics.

Publication history
I.C.E. published the cyberpunk role-playing game Cyberspace in 1989. CyberRogues was published the following year, a 40-page softcover book written by Steve Bouton, with art by Janet Aulisio.

Reviews
White Wolf #23 (Oct./Nov., 1990)

References

Cyberspace (role-playing game)
Role-playing game supplements introduced in 1990
Science fiction role-playing game supplements